Alex Tintaru (born 25 April 1977 in Moldova) is the bass player for Turkish rock bands Direc-t and Dorian.

In 1983 Tintaru entered the Music High School of Sergey Rahmanninov and graduated from the piano course in 1991. In 1993 he graduated from the piano and contrabass courses at Stefan Nyaga Music College. In 1998 he received honours as a music teacher from the M. Solokov Open Pedagogy University. Starting from 1990, he played with various bands such as Crystal Shit, Cripples, Fuctory and Vid Sboku in Moldova.

Between the years of 1996 and 1997 Tintaru became part of the academic staff as a piano teacher at the Music School of the Mussorgsky Conservatory in Yekaterinburg, Russia.

References

1977 births
Living people
Turkish musicians
Turkish rock musicians